Lymaraina D'Souza is an Indian model and Femina Miss India Universe of 1998.

She subsequently got her Masters in Counseling and is Licensed as a therapist. Lymaraina owns a thriving private practice now.

Career
D'Souza was born in 1979 in Bombay and was educated at Fort Convent School, Mumbai and Sydenham College of Commerce and Economics.

She was crowned Femina Miss India Universe 1998 by the outgoing titleholder Nafisa Joseph. She represented India at Miss Universe 1998 held on 12 May 1998 at Stan Sheriff Arena in Honolulu, Hawaii, United States. She was among the top ten finalists. She was ranked second in the interview round, ninth in the swimsuit round and eighth in the evening gown round.

D'Souza subsequently went to Hawaii Pacific University and graduated with a B.A. in psychology in 2002.

References

1979 births
Hawaii Pacific University alumni
Indian beauty pageant winners
Female models from Mumbai
Living people
Miss Universe 1998 contestants